Clara Barton School may refer to:

 Clara Barton High School, Brooklyn, New York
Clara Barton School (Philadelphia, Pennsylvania), listed on the U.S. National Register of Historic Places
Clara Barton School (Cabin John, Maryland), also known as Clara Barton Community Center, a Maryland Historical Trust-inventoried historic place, designed by Howard Wright Cutler

See also
Schools named for Clara Barton